John Patrick Cronin (May 3, 1903 – January 18, 1993) was an American football back who played four seasons with the Providence Steam Roller of the National Football League. He played college football at Boston College. He also attended Dean College in Franklin, Massachusetts. Jack's brother Bill and nephew Bill also played football.

References

External links
Just Sports Stats

1903 births
1993 deaths
Dean Bulldogs football players
Players of American football from Massachusetts
American football running backs
Dean College alumni
Boston College Eagles football players
Providence Steam Roller players
People from Hingham, Massachusetts
Sportspeople from Plymouth County, Massachusetts